Victor Ezeji (born June 9, 1981) is a Nigerian football striker who last played for Crown F.C.
He is one of the most successful and longest-playing players in the Nigeria Football League . He won two Africa Champions League with Enyimba football club, Aba, Abia State, Nigeria.

International 

The striker played in eight international matches for the Super Eagles.

Notes

1981 births
Living people
Igbo sportspeople
Nigerian footballers
Association football forwards
Enyimba F.C. players
Sharks F.C. players
Dolphin F.C. (Nigeria) players
Nigeria international footballers